Jerusalem Biblical Zoo railway station is an Israel Railways station on the Jaffa-Jerusalem railway, located in the southwestern part of the city next to the Jerusalem Biblical Zoo. The station sees limited service; with only 26,445 passengers recorded in 2019, it was the country's second least-used station, ahead of only Dimona railway station.

Service to the station has been suspended entirely since March 2020 due to poor usage combined with the economic impacts of the COVID-19 pandemic, and it is unclear if or when it will resume.

References

Railway stations in Jerusalem